The 1886 Men's tennis tour was composed of the eleventh annual pre-open era tour incorporating 100 tournaments. The tour began in March in Auckland, New Zealand and ended in December in Napier, New Zealand.

Summary of tour 
In the four most important tournaments of the year Herbert Lawford win a third successive Irish Lawn Tennis Championships title in Dublin beating Willoughby Hamilton in four sets. William Renshaw wins a sixth consecutive Wimbledon Championship defeating Irish Champion Herbert Lawford in four sets. At the Northern Championships in Liverpool, Harry Grove beats defending champion James Dwight in three straight sets.
In the United States Dick Sears wins a sixth consecutive US National Championship beating Robert Livingston Beeckman in four sets.

In the United States the sectional tournaments the New England Championships, Northwestern Championships and Southern Championships are all staged for the first time this year. In New Zealand the New Zealand Championships are held for the first time at Napier, New Zealand.

Irish player Willoughby Hamilton and British player Ernest Wool Lewis were joint title leaders this season winning 4 titles each. Harry Grove reached the most finals with 7 in total winning 3 of them.

Calendar 

Notes 1: Challenge Round: the final round of a tournament, in which the winner of a single-elimination phase faces the previous year's champion, who plays only that one match. The challenge round was used in the early history of tennis (from 1877 through 1921), in some tournaments not all.* Indicates challenger

Notes 2:Tournaments in italics were events that were staged only once that season

Key

January 
No events

February 
No events

March

April

May

June

July

August

September

October

November

December

Rankings 

Source: The Concise History of Tennis

Notes

References

Sources 
 A. Wallis Myers, ed. (1903). Lawn Tennis at Home and Abroad (1st ed.). New York: Charles Scribner's Sons. OCLC 5358651.
 Gillmeister, Heiner (1998). Tennis:Cultural History. London: A&C Black. .
 Hall, Valentine Gill (1889). Lawn tennis in America. Biographical sketches of all the prominent players ... knotty points, and all the latest rules and directions governing handicaps, umpires, and rules for playing. New York, NY, USA: New York, D. W. Granbery & Co.
 Lake, Robert J. (2014). A Social History of Tennis in Britain: Volume 5 of Routledge Research in Sports History. Routledge:. .
 Mazak, Karoly (2017). The Concise History of Tennis. Independently published. .
 Nauright, John; Parrish, Charles (2012). Sports Around the World: History, Culture, and Practice. Santa Barbara, Calif.: ABC-CLIO. .
 Nieuwland, Alex (2009–2017). "Tournaments – Search for Tournament – Year – 1886". www.tennisarchives.com. Harlingen, Netherlands: Idzznew BV.
 Paret, Jahial Parmly; Allen, J. P.; Alexander, Frederick B.; Hardy, Samuel [from old catalog (1918). Spalding's tennis annual . New York, NY, USA: New York, American sports publishing company.

Further reading 
 A. Wallis Myers, ed. (1903). Lawn Tennis at Home and Abroad (1st ed.). New York: Charles Scribner's Sons.
 Ayre's Lawn Tennis Almanack And Tournament Guide, 1908 to 1938, A. Wallis Myers.
 Baily's Monthly Magazine of Sports and Pastimes, and Racing Register, A.H. Baily & Company of Cornhill. London. England. 1860 to 1889
 Baily's Magazine of Sports and Pastimes, A.H. Baily & Company of Cornhill. London. England. 1889 to 1900
 Baily's Magazine of Sports and Pastimes, Vinton and Co. London. England. 1900 to 1926.
 British Lawn Tennis and Squash Magazine, 1948 to 1967, British Lawn Tennis Ltd, UK.
 Dunlop Lawn Tennis Almanack And Tournament Guide, G.P. Hughes, 1939 to 1958, Dunlop Sports Co. Ltd, UK
 Lawn tennis and Badminton Magazine, 1906 to 1973, UK.
 Lowe's Lawn Tennis Annuals and Compendia, Lowe, Sir F. Gordon, Eyre & Spottiswoode
 Spalding's Lawn Tennis Annuals from 1885 to 1922, American Sports Pub. Co, USA.
 Total Tennis:The Ultimate Tennis Encyclopedia, by Bud Collins, Sport Classic Books, Toronto, Canada, 
 The Tennis Book, edited by Michael Bartlett and Bob Gillen, Arbor House, New York, 1981 
 The World of Tennis Annuals, Barrett John, 1970 to 2001.

Attribution 
This article contains some copied and translated content from this article :it:Tornei di tennis maschili nel 1886

External links 
 http://www.tennisarchives.com/tournaments/search for any tournament/1886

Pre Open era tennis seasons
1886 in tennis